Van Amelsvoort is a Dutch surname. Notable people with the surname include:

 Marius van Amelsvoort (1930–2006), Dutch politician
 Syreeta van Amelsvoort, Dutch Paralympic swimmer

Dutch-language surnames